Lower Yukon School District is a school district headquartered in Mountain Village, Alaska, serving the Kusilvak Census Area. As of the 2017-18 school year, it has 1,998 students across 10 schools. 91% are American Indian or Alaska Native and 5% are multiracial.

Schools
The district operates only K-12 schools due to the small and isolated nature of the villages within the district. Each village has one school. High school students have the option of applying out-of-district to the state's public boarding schools, Nenana Student Living Center and Mt. Edgecumbe High School.
 Alakanuk School (226 students)
 Emmonak School (207 students)
 Hooper Bay School (456 students)
 Kotlik School (179 students)
 Marshall School (119 students)
 Mountain Village School (196 students)
 Nunam Iqua School (64 students)
 Pilot Station School (191 students)
 Russian Mission School (125 students)
 Scammon Bay School (234 students)

High school juniors and seniors may apply to spend nine-week sessions at Kusilvak Career Academy, a residential program that allows students to take career and technical education classes in Anchorage.

Former schools
Pitkas Point School served eight students in pre-K through eighth grade and shut down after that 2011-12 school year. Students from Pitkas Point are now zoned for Saint Mary's City Schools.

References

External links
 

School districts in Alaska
Kusilvak Census Area, Alaska